Cinto Caomaggiore is a town and comune in the Metropolitan City of Venice, Veneto, Italy. SS251 goes through it.

References

External links
(Google Maps)

Cities and towns in Veneto